The women's flyweight (−51 kilograms) event at the 2002 Asian Games took place on Friday 11 October 2002 at Gudeok Gymnasium, Busan, South Korea.

A total of eleven competitors from eleven different countries competed in this event, limited to fighters whose body weight was less than 51 kilograms.

Lim Su-jeong of South Korea won the gold medal after beating Yaowapa Boorapolchai of Thailand in gold medal match 3–3 by superiority.

Schedule
All times are Korea Standard Time (UTC+09:00)

Results 
Legend
R — Won by referee stop contest

References
2002 Asian Games Official Report, Page 727

External links
Official website

Taekwondo at the 2002 Asian Games